Mohamed El Ouafa (1948 – 27 December 2020) was a Moroccan diplomat and politician of the Istiqlal Party. He was Minister of Education in  Abdelilah Benkirane's cabinet.

Life
Between 2000 and 2012 he was Ambassador to India, Iran, and Brazil.

In April 2013, while King Mohammed VI was on vacation in France, Hamid Chabat Secretary-General of the Istiqlal Party announced his intentions to leave the coalition that forms the cabinet of Abdelilah Benkirane. Consequently, a resignation request was submitted on 9 July 2013 for all the Party's ministers.

El Oufa died from COVID-19 at age 72, during the COVID-19 pandemic in Morocco.

See also
 Cabinet of Morocco
 Istiqlal Party

References

External links
 Ministry of Education

1948 births
2020 deaths
Education Ministers of Morocco
Government ministers of Morocco
Moroccan diplomats
People from Marrakesh
Ambassadors of Morocco to India
Ambassadors of Morocco to Iran
Ambassadors of Morocco to Brazil
Istiqlal Party politicians
Deaths from the COVID-19 pandemic in Morocco